The Jury may refer to:

Jury, a body of persons convened to render a verdict in a legal situation
The Jury (comics), a fictional group of armored vigilantes in the Marvel Comics universe
The Jury (TV serial), a 2002 British miniseries starring Gerard Butler and Derek Jacobi, with a second, unconnected series in 2011
The Jury (TV series), a 2004 American television series
"The Jury", a song by Morphine from Yes
A Time to Kill (1996 film), titled in some languages as "The Jury."

See also
Jury (disambiguation)

fr:Jury (homonymie)